Grand Gulf Military State Park is a Mississippi state park located 10 miles northwest of Port Gibson in an unincorporated area, now the ghost town of Grand Gulf, in Claiborne County. The park includes the remnants of two batteries that fired on and repelled Ulysses S. Grant's forces during the Battle of Grand Gulf. After the Battle of Port Gibson, Grant made Grand Gulf his base of operations. It is listed on the National Register of Historic Places and is a Mississippi Landmark.

The 400-acre landmark includes Fort Cobun and Fort Wade earth works, the Grand Gulf Cemetery, a museum, campgrounds, picnic facilities, hiking trails, an observation tower, and restored buildings.

The town of Grand Gulf was originally a port on the Mississippi River, but after being burned during the Civil War and a shift in the flow of the Mississippi River, the community became a ghost town.

Gallery

References

External links

  Grand Gulf Military Park, official web site
 

State parks of Mississippi
Mississippi Landmarks
Protected areas of Claiborne County, Mississippi
Museums in Claiborne County, Mississippi
American Civil War museums in Mississippi
Cemeteries on the National Register of Historic Places in Mississippi
National Register of Historic Places in Claiborne County, Mississippi
Parks on the National Register of Historic Places in Mississippi